New Munich is a city in Stearns County, Minnesota, United States. The population was 320 at the 2010 census. It is part of the St. Cloud Metropolitan Statistical Area.

History
A post office called New Munich has been in operation since 1863. The city was named after Munich, Germany, the native home of an early settler.

Geography

State Highway 237 (Main Street) and Stearns County Roads 12 and 30 are three of the main routes in the community. Interstate Highway 94/U.S. Highway 52 passes nearby.

Demographics

2010 census
As of the census of 2010, there were 320 people, 124 households, and 83 families living in the city. The racial makeup of the city was 100.0% White.

There were 124 households, of which 34.7% had children under the age of 18 living with them, 55.6% were married couples living together, 4.0% had a female householder with no husband present, 7.3% had a male householder with no wife present, and 33.1% were non-families. 24.2% of all households were made up of individuals, and 12.9% had someone living alone who was 65 years of age or older. The average household size was 2.52 and the average family size was 3.02.

The median age in the city was 39.5 years. 26.6% of residents were under the age of 18; 1.6% were between the ages of 18 and 24; 28.1% were from 25 to 44; 25% were from 45 to 64; and 18.8% were 65 years of age or older. The gender makeup of the city was 51.3% male and 48.8% female.

2000 census
As of the census of 2000, there were 352 people, 126 households, and 89 families living in the city. The racial makeup of the city was 99.15% White, 0.28% Native American, and 0.57% from two or more races. Hispanic or Latino of any race were 0.57% of the population.

There were 126 households, out of which 28.6% had children under the age of 18 living with them, 64.3% were married couples living together, 1.6% had a female householder with no husband present, and 28.6% were non-families. 23.8% of all households were made up of individuals, and 19.0% had someone living alone who was 65 years of age or older.  The average household size was 2.63 and the average family size was 3.16.

In the city, the population was spread out, with 22.4% under the age of 18, 10.2% from 18 to 24, 23.6% from 25 to 44, 18.2% from 45 to 64, and 25.6% who were 65 years of age or older.  The median age was 40 years. For every 100 females, there were 92.3 males.  For every 100 females age 18 and over, there were 89.6 males.

The median income for a household in the city was $38,750, and the median income for a family was $47,000. Males had a median income of $33,750 versus $21,607 for females. The per capita income for the city was $15,016.  About 2.4% of families and 14.6% of the population were below the poverty line, including 4.9% of those under age 18 and 46.9% of those age 65 or over.

In the media
In his book In Search of Lake Wobegon, Garrison Keillor says that he used to live near New Munich with his family. It is one of the towns on which his fictional Lake Wobegon is based. He describes a hugely impressive church, probably Immaculate Conception on Main Street.

References

Cities in Minnesota
Cities in Stearns County, Minnesota
St. Cloud, Minnesota metropolitan area